Araucaria muelleri is a species of conifer in the family Araucariaceae. It is a medium size tree, 10–25 meters in height, with larger leaves than most other New Caledonian Araucarias. It is found only in New Caledonia, in several sites in the far south of Grande Terre, the main island.

Conservation
The species is threatened by habitat loss, with both forest fires and nickel mining activities posing ongoing threats to the remaining populations, although some stands of trees are located within protected national park areas.

References

muelleri
Conservation dependent plants
Endemic flora of New Caledonia
Taxonomy articles created by Polbot
Taxa named by Adolphe-Théodore Brongniart
Taxa named by Jean Antoine Arthur Gris
Taxa named by Élie-Abel Carrière